Ingmar Bergman's Cinema is a Blu-ray disc box set featuring 39 films directed by Ingmar Bergman, released by the Criterion Collection on November 20, 2018 in the United States. The set spans Bergman's early career, beginning in the 1940s, up to his final film in 2003. The films are organized non-chronologically, and are instead presented in four groupings that mimic the procession of a film festival. Accompanying the discs is a book featuring critical essays on each of the films, intended to guide the viewer through the experience. Of the 39 films featured, 17 had not been previously released by the Criterion Collection prior to their inclusion in the set.

The Criterion Collection announced the release of the set on July 13, 2018, in commemoration of Bergman's centenary birthday on July 14, 2018.

Overview
The box set includes 39 films directed by Ingmar Bergman across 30 Blu-ray discs, spanning six decades. The films are arranged as a curated festival with 'opening' and 'closing' nights bookending double features and 'centerpiece' programs. 

In addition to the films, the set comes with supplementary materials included on the individual discs, as well as on an exclusive supplementary disc presented as the final disc of the set. Introductions from Bergman himself are included for eleven of the films, while six also feature audio commentaries; additionally, there are over five hours of interviews with Bergman's key collaborators. Accompanying the discs is a 248-page book containing various essays on the films as they presented, intended to guide the viewer through the experience of watching each.

Contents

Films

Additional discs

Packaging and artwork
Ingmar Bergman's Cinema is packaged in a hardbox which contains a cardboard binder holding the individual discs. The cover artwork for the box features a still image from Persona (1966), while the back displays a portrait of Bergman.

Reception
The New York Times critic Glenn Kenny assessed the set as "impressive and almost exhaustive", and interpreted it as "a fresh case for [Bergman's] continuing importance", in response to criticisms such as Jonathan Rosenbaum's 2007 opinion piece "Scenes From an Overrated Career". David Mermelstein of The Wall Street Journal noted that, "despite some oddities in presentation," the set "shows [that] the director’s work continues to merit close attention."

Notes

References

Ingmar Bergman
The Criterion Collection